Gonystylus lucidulus is a species of plant in the Thymelaeaceae family. It is found in Brunei and Malaysia.

References

lucidulus
Vulnerable plants
Taxonomy articles created by Polbot